Curse the Darkness is the third full-length album by California rock band Viva Death. The album was released in 2010 on Functional Equivalent Recordings.

Track listing
 "The Life You Save (May Be Your Own)"	
 "Impact"	
 "Bullets Under Mind Control"	
 "Love Lust Trust"	
 "Everything's Tic-toc"	
 "Villain"	
 "Freeze"	
 "Talking Backwards"	
 "Out of Reach"	
 "In Search of Space Boy"	
 "It's Like This"	
 "Wisdom"	
 "Crutch"

Credits
 Scott Shiflett – Baritone guitar, guitar, bass, drums, keyboards, and vocals.

Additional musicians
 Charlie Ellis (Guitar & vocals, The Life You Save)
 Satnam Singh Ramgotra (Tabla, Love Lust Trust)
 Monica Richards (Vocals, Talking Backwards)

References

Viva Death albums
2010 albums